Yuri Panteleyevich Avrutskiy (9 May 1944 – 30 January 2009) was a Soviet professional football player.

Honours
 Soviet Top League champion: 1963.
 Soviet Top League runner-up: 1967, 1970.
 Soviet Cup winner: 1967, 1970.

External links
 
 Profile by fc-dynamo.ru

1944 births
2009 deaths
People from Amur Oblast
Soviet footballers
FC Dynamo Moscow players
FC Shakhtar Donetsk players
Association football forwards
Neftçi PFK players
Soviet Top League players
Sportspeople from Amur Oblast